Maro Reef (Hawaiian: Nalukākala  - "surf that arrives in combers") is a largely submerged coral atoll located in the Northwestern Hawaiian Islands. It was discovered in 1820 by Captain Joseph Allen of the ship Maro, after whose ship the reef was named. It contains 37 species of stony coral. Unlike most atolls, the coral extends out from the center like spokes on a wheel. Some scientists believe that it "may be on the verge of drowning" because the reefs are detached and are vulnerable to strong storm waves.

USNS Mission San Miguel (T-AO-129) ran aground on the reef, while running at full speed and in ballast, and sank on October 8, 1957.

Dowsett Reef
Dowsett reef (also called Dowsett's rock) is to the south of Maro Reef. The sailing ship McNear, a bark, sunk on Dowsett reef on May 14, 1900. The ship's occupants of 33 survived by sailing in boats to Laysan island.

See also
List of reefs
List of volcanoes in the Hawaiian – Emperor seamount chain

References 

Maro Reef Northwestern Hawaiian Islands Coral Reef Ecosystem Reserve
Quick Facts on Maro Reef from the PBS Ocean Adventures site
 Papahānaumokuākea Marine National Monument Information Management System

Northwestern Hawaiian Islands
Atolls of Hawaii
Coral reefs of the United States
Hawaiian–Emperor seamount chain
Reefs of the Pacific Ocean
Miocene volcanoes
Paleogene Oceania
Cenozoic Hawaii
Important Bird Areas of Hawaii